Péter Bíró (born 20 September 1985 in Debrecen, Hungary) is a Hungarian football (defender) currently plays for Lombard-Pápa TFC.

Honours

 Debreceni VSC
Hungarian National Championship I: 2008–09, 2009–10
Runner-up 2007–08
Hungarian Cup: 2007–08, 2009–10
Hungarian Super Cup: 2009, 2010
Hungarian League Cup: Runner-up 2008

References 
HLSZ 
Nemzeti Sport 

1985 births
Living people
Sportspeople from Debrecen
Hungarian footballers
Association football central defenders
Baktalórántháza VSE footballers
Debreceni VSC players
Lombard-Pápa TFC footballers
Egri FC players